Ilemi is an administrative ward in the Mbeya Urban district of the Mbeya Region of Tanzania. In 2016 the Tanzania National Bureau of Statistics report there were 29,582 people in the ward, from 26,841 in 2012.

Neighborhoods 
The ward has 6 neighborhoods.
 Ilemi
 Ilindi
 Maanga VETA
 Mapelele
 Masewe
 Mwafute

References 

Wards of Mbeya Region